Jiant was a British record production and songwriting team, headed by Tim Hawes and Pete Kirtley, working in the genres of pop, R&B and dance. Following their formation in 1999, the team expanded to a maximum of seven writers, including Dave Valler and Tim Hart.

In 2002, they received an Ivor Novello Award for their work on "Pure and Simple", the fastest-selling UK single of 2001.

Selected production discography

2001
 Hear'Say - "Can't Stop Thinking about That"
 Hear'Say - "Pure and Simple"

2003
 Bro'Sis - "V.I.P."
 Kym Marsh - "After Goodbye"
 No Angels - "No Angel (It's All in Your Mind)"
 No Angels - "So What"

2006
 Joana Zimmer - "What It the Good in Goodbye"
 Monrose - "Do That Dance"
 Monrose - "Live Life Get By"
 Monrose - "Oh La La"
 Monrose - "Shame"
 Sugababes - "Now You're Gone"

2007
 Lisa Bund - "All That I Am"
 Lisa Bund - "In My Head"
 Monrose - "Everybody Makes Mistakes"
 Monrose - "Leading Me on"
 Monrose - "Rebound"
 Monrose - "Strictly Physical"
 Monrose - "What You Don't Know"
 Monrose - "Yesterday's Gone"
 Mutya Buena - Strung Out
 No Angels - "Make a Change"
 No Angels - "Misguided Heart"
 Room2012 - "Chuckoo Brain"
 Room2012 - "Don't Let the Sun"
 Room2012 - "Fresh"
 Room2012 - "Head Bash"
 Room2012 - "Mr. DJ"
 Room2012 - "Naughty but Nice"
 Room2012 - "Simple Things"

2008
 Monrose - "Strike the Match"
 Monrose - "Going out tonight"

External links
Jiant.co.uk

British record production teams
British songwriting teams